Caloptilia chalcoptera is a moth of the family Gracillariidae. It is known from New South Wales and Queensland, Australia.

References

chalcoptera
Moths of Australia
Moths described in 1880